The Goodnow Library is an historic public library building located at 21 Concord Road in Sudbury, Massachusetts. It is named for Sudbury-native John Goodnow II, who died in 1851 and left to the town of Sudbury a  site for a library, $2,500 to build it, and $20,000 to buy books and to maintain it. Construction of the two-story octagon-shaped building began in 1862 and was finished in 1863. In the 1990s, the library was expanded to its present size, but the original octagon survives as a reading room.

On May 22, 2002, it was added to the National Register of Historic Places.

See also
National Register of Historic Places listings in Middlesex County, Massachusetts

References

External links
 Goodnow Library website
 Goodnow Library gallery
 Etching of the octagon library ca. 1888

Library buildings completed in 1863
Libraries on the National Register of Historic Places in Massachusetts
Octagonal buildings in the United States
Public libraries in Massachusetts
Buildings and structures in Sudbury, Massachusetts
Libraries in Middlesex County, Massachusetts
National Register of Historic Places in Middlesex County, Massachusetts
1863 establishments in Massachusetts